This article lists the history record of the Panthers at the University of Wisconsin–Milwaukee.
 From 1979–2001 the Horizon League was called the Midwestern Collegiate Conference.
 Panthers moved all sports to NCAA Division 1 in the 1990–91 school year.
 Men's soccer has been in NCAA Division I since 1973, men's basketball was in division 1 from 1973–1980 before moving back to Division III.
In 2007 the Mid-Continent Conference changed its name to the Summit League.

Men's Basketball

Women's Basketball

Men's Soccer

 * Won Conference Tournament (2013, 2005, 2004, 2003, 2002)

Football
See List of Milwaukee Panthers football seasons

Women's Soccer

 * Won Conference Tournament (2022, 2021, 2019, 2018, 2013, 2012, 2011, 2010, 2009, 2008, 2005, 2002, 2001, 1997)

Baseball

University of Wisconsin–Milwaukee
Milwaukee Panthers athletes
Panthers